Michelle Curley (born 30 April 1972) is a former England women's international footballer. Curley scored the winning goal in the 1993 WFA Cup Final for Arsenal.

Honours
Arsenal
 FA Women's Cup: 1993

References

1972 births
Living people
Women's association football fullbacks
Arsenal W.F.C. players
English women's footballers
England women's international footballers